Obereopsis obsoleta is a species of beetle in the family Cerambycidae. It was described by Chevrolat in 1858. It is known from the Ivory Coast, Gabon, Angola, Ghana, the Democratic Republic of the Congo, and Togo.

Varietas
 Obereopsis obsoleta var. fuscoampliata Breuning, 1950
 Obereopsis obsoleta var. fusciceps Breuning, 1957

References

obsoleta
Beetles described in 1858